Barentsøya, sometimes anglicized as Barents Island, is an island in the Svalbard archipelago of Norway, lying between Edgeøya and Spitsbergen. Barents Island has no permanent human inhabitants. Named for the Dutch explorer Willem Barents (who actually never sighted the island), it is a part of Søraust-Svalbard Nature Reserve.

Barentsøya is an Arctic island. To the north, in the sound between Barentsøya and Spitsbergen, lies the island of Kükenthaløya. To the south, the sound separating Barents Island from Edgeøya is Freemansundet.

In geologic time much of the surface rock has been eroded by glaciation. The entire area is visited by polar bears, who have a recognisable genetic differentiation specialised to the Barents Sea region. At Dørstubukta there is also a large nesting mainly used by kittiwakes.

Geography

The ice cap of Barentsjøkulen covers a large part of the island, with the largest offspring Besselsbreen (north), Duckwitzbreen (west), Freemanbreen (south), and Hübnerbreen (southeast). Barentsjøkulen has the two large ice domes of Peer Gyntslottet and Solveigdomen. The mountain of Schweinfurthberget is a nunatak of Barentsjøkulen.

At the northern side of Barentsøya is the ice-free peninsula of Frankenhalvøya, between Ginevra Bay at the western side and Dorstbukta to the east. Grimheia is an ice-free mountainous area extending over a length of about thirteen kilometers at the northern part of the island. The westernmost point of the island is the headland of Mistakodden. At the southern part of Barentsøya are the mountains of Krefftberget and Høgrinden, while Jeppeberget is located to the southeast. The largest lakes of the island are Veslemjøsa in Heimarka, and Dalskilvatnet between the valleys of Sjodalen and Grimdalen.

See also
 List of islands of Norway

References

Line notes
C. Michael Hogan (2008) Polar Bear: Ursus maritimus'', globalTwitcher.com, ed. Nicklas Stromberg

External links
Svalbard Images: Barentsøya (URL accessed 26 December 2008)

 
Islands of Svalbard
Uninhabited islands of Norway